, sometimes Endnesia or Exotica, is an adventure video game developed by Vanpool and published by Enix for the PlayStation 2. The game was developed by Vanpool and published by Enix exclusively in Japan on May 31, 2001. It is Vanpool’s debut game.

Gameplay
The player takes on the role of a 5th-grade boy who is accidentally warped to a fictional island called Endonesia. The protagonist must communicate with the island's 50 sealed gods in order to return home. The boy does so by obtaining several abilities called Emo powers, which draw on his emotions, and the emotions of those around him. The game features day and night cycles as well as days of the week, with the island stuck in a 10-day time loop.

Development
Endonesia was developed by Vanpool, which is composed of former members of Love-de-Lic. The game's instruction manual was made similar to a travel pamphlet. Titled Endonesia Airlines, it includes a map, photographs of food and wildlife from the game, and a letter of welcome to the island.

Reception
On release, Famitsu magazine scored the game a 32 out of 40. Endonesia only managed to sell 9,757 copies during its first week of sale in Japan.

References

External links
 

2001 video games
Adventure games
Enix games
Japan-exclusive video games
PlayStation 2 games
PlayStation 2-only games
Single-player video games
Vanpool games
Video games about time loops
Video games developed in Japan
Video games set on fictional islands